WMNF is a non-commercial, community radio station operating in the city of Tampa in the U.S. state of Florida that broadcasts at the FM frequency of 88.5 MHz and streaming live. The station has been on the air since September 14, 1979, and has an effective radiated power of 6,650 watts from antenna 1,539 feet height above average terrain.

The radio station is listener sponsored, relying on supporters for about 70% majority of required funding, which is raised in three semiannual pledge drives. The station has paid operations staff, but the daily programmers and pledge drive workers are volunteers. The station is licensed to the Nathan B. Stubblefield Foundation, a non-profit organization established solely for this purpose. The Board of Directors comprises programmers, volunteers, staff, and community members.

WMNF hosts many concerts, speeches, films, and festivals, most notably the annual Tropical Heatwave Festival. The last Heatwave occurred in 2016.

Facilities
In 2005, WMNF moved into a new state of the art broadcast facility. The facility is located adjacent to the old studio which was demolished and now serves as a parking lot. The music library is capable of storing approximately 100,000 CDs, and has about 8,000 record albums. The landscape is made up of native Florida plants.

In 2007, WMNF moved to a higher antenna tower and started to broadcast a Hybrid Digital signal.

Programs and personnel
WMNF has from the beginning aired a wide variety of programming, including special interest music shows including bluegrass, polka, gospel, Celtic, Latin and experimental. The major music styles on WMNF are rock, folk and blues, considered Triple A radio. WMNF also features several hip hop shows, including one of the longest running hip hop shows in Florida, The Saturday Night Shutdown. WMNF also holds their "Flashback Friday" every Friday, where they go and broadcast hit music from the past day. It runs from 10pm to 12am.

WMNF's progressive news and public affairs programs have steadily increased since the nineties. While the schedule has constantly changed (there is a review of the schedule every 2 years and there may be major or minor changes made through that process), the station has a number of long-running programs including the Sixties Show, the Morning Show, Caribbean Cruise, The Soul Party, Saturday Asylum and public affairs programs such as RadioActivity and From a Woman's Point of View (formerly The Women's Show), a show touching on feminist issues that first started running in the 1980s, Art in Your Ear, Talking Animals, and True Talk, which focuses on the Middle East and the global issues Muslims face. In February 2013 WMNF also introduced to Tampa-area listeners the weekly music, arts and culture program "Life Elsewhere" hosted by veteran radio personality Norman B. (Batley), a venerable brand that dates back to the 1970s in the Pacific Northwest.

HD channels
WMNF broadcasts four HD Radio channels:
 HD-1 simulcasts the main WMNF signal.
 HD-2 new Indie music and music shows featuring new releases.
 HD-3 The Source, which airs news, public affairs, and arts programming.
 HD-4 Soul School featuring classic soul, R&B, blues, reggae and rap.

Controversies
While providing extensive public affairs programming to the greater Tampa Bay area, and perhaps because of it, WMNF has at times become the focus of controversy.

In 1997, Florida state Senator John Grant zeroed out $104,000 in state funding from the annual budget, citing his displeasure at the lyrics of a song he had heard broadcast (Iris DeMent's "Wasteland of the Free"). In response to the shortfall, the station staged an emergency fund-raiser that took in $122,000 in a day and a half. Then Programming Director, Randy Wynne indicated his belief that such difficulties arose after WMNF aired several criticisms against State Senator Grant's opposition to Olympic gold medalist diver, and outspoken LGBTQ activist Greg Louganis attending a speaking engagement at the University of South Florida.

See also
List of community radio stations in the United States

References

External links
 
 The Source HD-3

Radio stations established in 1979
MNF
Community radio stations in the United States
NPR member stations
1979 establishments in Florida